The 1893 Lehigh football team was an American football team that represented Lehigh University as an independent during the 1893 college football season. In its first and only season under head coach Harmon S. Graves, the team compiled a 7–3 record and outscored opponents by a total of 174 to 84.

Schedule

References

Lehigh
Lehigh Mountain Hawks football seasons
Lehigh football